The Morrow 1-L was a prototype tandem-seat trainer produced by the Morrow Aircraft Corporation. It employed plastic impregnated wood in its construction.

Design and development
Morrow Aircraft factory designed and built the Model 1-L tandem two-seat trainer for Civilian Pilot Training Program. Morrow Aircraft used a plastic bonded plywood construction for the body and was powered by a Lycoming O-435 engine. The Model 1-L  was also called the Victory Trainer. The factory was at the Municipal Airport, San Bernardino, now Norton Air Force Base. Designed by Edgar Schmued who also worked on the North American P-51 Mustang. The Victory Trainer prototype was built, but not used for the World War II effort. The Victory Trainer wing and tail resembled that of the P-51 Mustang, so the plane was called the Little Mustang by some.

The aircraft was officially tested by Vance Breese in front of an audience of American and British military officials on 1 November 1941. Construction on a static test as well as a second airworthy airframe began a few weeks later. Following completion, the aircraft was flown to Purdue University Airport, where it was tested by Purdue University students.

Specifications (Morrow 1-L Victory Trainer)

See also

References

Further reading

 
 
 

1940s United States civil trainer aircraft
Single-engined tractor aircraft
Low-wing aircraft
Aircraft first flown in 1941